Väino Tamm (8 August 1930 – 26 June 1986) was an Estonian interior designer, vice associate professor in ERKI in from 1959 and interior design department manager in 1968–1986, from 1970 he was the associate professor of the interior design department in ERKI. He was one of the firsts to pave the way to the interior design department as we know it today. Väino Tamm changed the spatial design profession into a subject that deals with problems involving interior design and instead of decorating the space on the contrary dealing with arranging it. Also dealing with an overall effect and the room's whole impact on a person.

He started as an interior designer in the 1950s (Tartu hotel "Park" interiors and furniture). In the 1960s Väino Tamm became one of the most outstanding spatial designers in Estonia.

Life and career 
Väino Tamm was born in Tallinn, however he lived in Järvamaa. His mother Erna was a teacher, his father Gustav was an agronomist.

He studied in Ambla, Alatskivi and Reola primary schools in 1938–44. In 1945-49 he studied in Tapa high school, where one of his classmates was Teddy Böckler, who later became known as an architect and an architectural historian (he also graduated the interior design department in 1955).

1949-1955 Väino Tamm studied interior design at Tallinn's National Applied Arts Institution (later known as ERKI, nowadays EKA), he graduated cum laude.

1955-1958 he was a professor at Tartu School of Fine Arts (later Tartu Art School).

1958-1959 economist at the furniture factory ‘Puit’.

1959-1970 locum professor in ERKI.

1968-1986 head of the interior design department in ERKI.

1970–1986 associate professor of the interior design department.

From 1958 he was a member of the Union of Architects in Estonia.

1967 Estonian SSR respected architect.

His wife Leelo-Helgi Tamm was a philologist, he had two children - Pille Lausmäe (born 23.04.1958, also an interior architect; mother of the interior architect Ville Lausmäe) and Kalevi Tamm.

Väino Tamm is buried in Metsakalmistu.

Training in Finland 
In 1967–68, before becoming the head of the interior design department Väino Tamm got a chance to be a trainee at Helsinki University of Technology in Finland.

The Ministry of Education in Finland sent Väino Tamm to school in Helsinki now known as Aalto University. His tutor there was the head of the fine arts department and an interior designer - Seppo Paatero.

The main idea was to obtain material from the organization of studying in the university. When Tamm finished his trainee period he wrote a detailed report on the study of interior design in Finland. In the report he described the programs, resources, exercises and the learning conditions. The more precise research topic in Finland was the furniture in schools, the sources of interior design and projecting, also interior fittings. In addition to supervising the study-methods in the university he actively took part in studies and was a tutor to students.

Because Tamm moved in the circles of architects and interior designers he had the chance to get familiar with practical training at architectural offices. He earned some extra money working at the architectural bureau of Kristi and Erkki Helamaa.

The opportunity to work and study in Finland in the history of architecture has become an indispensable element in the future development of Estonian interior design.

The interior design and furniture of Kurtna poultry farming house (completed right before his stay in Finland) is one of the most important objects of modern architecture. Tamm's internship therefore rather consolidated earlier beliefs, synthesized and developed them, since after the Finnish period there is no radical change in his work.

Contribution as a lecturer 
Väino Tamm was a valued, demanding and authoritative professor who changed the principles of teaching, giving priority to functionality. Due to Väino Tamm, spatial design in Estonia became the interior architecture. His approach to the space shifted from details to more general spatial effects, as well as the innovative design culture and problem set-up of interior design.

Instead of using the watercolor technique that was used to visualize the projects so far, Tamm introduced a black and white graphic bubble that shows perspective views of the space. The format used in the course also made a cardinal change - instead of using the regular A1, he started using drawings in the size of a post-card.

He also introduced the tradition of designing a stool and chair for the first course, which lasted for almost 50 years. He was a mentor of subjects related to furniture design and construction.

He also launched a strong school of space and furniture designing at ERKI, the so-called Tamme School, which promotes the functional direction of modernism.

Works 
Väino Tamm was one of the most recognized interior architects in the 1960s. His work is characterized by the influences of rigorous and minimalist Nordic modernism, which, as new architectural trends, dealt with the functionality, restraint of the form, and the overall effect of the space and the interior architecture layout.

He started as an interior designer in the second half of the 1950s when he finished his first project, which included the interiors and furniture of the ‘Park’ Hotel in Tartu.

Ascetic design of the interiors of the Tallinn Pegasus Cafe (1963, with Leila Pärtelpoeg and Allan Murdmaa), the Alvar Aalto curved veneer furniture is an influence for this furniture design. The Pegasus chairs play a very important role in the history of Estonian furniture. There are two dark painted plywood boards bent over a heavy iron structure, they are apart from each other and at a small angle, on the upper fifth of the back of the chair is a metal clip holding together the two veneers. The cafe was spread out on three floors, the first floor was a wardrobe, the second and third café dining rooms. On top of the spiral staircase that connected the three floors there was Estonia's first abstract cafe sculpture - Edgar Viiese's "Pegasus" made out of polished aluminum. The simple and spacious effect of the interior was achieved by a large curtainless window on one wall, overlooking the St. Nicholas Church and Harju Street's green area. The room was white and spacious, without separated areas or partitions. Also, the gray plastered walls with conical wall lamps placed in a geometric regularity, the light of which was directed towards the wall and reflected from it, gave a mild and enchanting impression. Pegasus became an important place for the birth of culture and an overall cultural scene, Pegasus’ youthfulness in the interior was strongly opposed to those of the other cafes at that time.

Laconic ones were also Tallinn restaurant "Gloria" (1963, with L. Pärtelpoja and A. Murdmaaga), cafe "Tallinn" (1967–69, co-author Vello Asi) and bar "Karoliina" (1968, co-author V. Asi). In the 1960s, the unique design of the Old Town café's became a true indicator of furnishing trends. Radically reorganized were features that were retained from previous times, as well as elements referring to history. Gloria's most impressive part was the big hall with live music, a special look was given to the hall by a suspended ceiling (made out of laminate slabs) with its angular lamps. In the cafe "Tallinn" instead of the using the original custom-made chairs, they used the authentic vienna chairs bent from beechwood that were remaining from the fire at the University of Tartu. These chairs fitted perfectly in the Old Town interior because of their historical cafe-chair image. The chairs were complemented by small square tables with rounded legs. A modern look was created by a horizontally positioned decorative deck covering one wall, with minimalist clothes racks . By the way, the "Tallinn" cafe and other confectionery products were famous all over the city. The varietee ceiling on the second floor of the cafe "Tallinn" as well as the "Karoliina" wineshelf of the bar were formed by welding the empty, bottomless cups from the fish compound. The interior of "Karoliina" had the most historic aura - the exhibited wall and the arched ceiling and the tables made out of the trunks of ancient trees. The modernity of the room was expressed on one wall in some square lamps, that were mounted close to the floor, which created mystical glow with a spotlight on the wall.

The interior of the Kurtna poultry test station (1967, Soviet Estonian Award 1967; all together with Vello Asi) seems to be like a reversed exterior, that has some repetitive materials as well as forms. In the hall the opposite direction of the lines, that arise from the combination of benches, brick walls and from the longitudinal wood ferm ceilings, is emphasized . Furniture also leaves an architectural impression. Similar to Tuljak, the ceiling is studded in straight lines with rounded copper lamp globes. The Nordic effect is given by the choice of materials, which are very close to nature: wood, copper, brick, glass. The most important part of the room, that also shapes the room is light. With the gradual ceiling the light gives the room a sacral expression. An abstract metal sculpture made by Riho Kuld also stood in the hall. The building won the Soviet Estonian Prize in 1967 and became a major object of admiration and a destination for excursions. Today the main building has become a hotel, the original finishing materials for the hall and lobby interiors have been preserved and the fireplace furniture has been restored.

At first Väino Tamm started planning the interiors of the Vanemuine Theater with Leila Pärtelpoeg, but completed it with Vello Asi, who joined the project when Tamm was in Finland. The project was officially done by Tamm alone, although several books published in the years of the 1960s-70s mention V.Asi as the co-author. The materials of the Vanemuise 700-seat theater hall were chosen based on the acoustic calculations. The large contrast of the room arose between a light floor, the artificial marble-covered walls and black furniture, above a curved plastered ceiling.

The hotel "Viru" designed in Tallinn was one of the most controversial new buildings in Estonia's 20th-century architecture. The hotel lounges, restaurant and varietee designed by Väino Tamm (1970-72 with V. Asi and Loomet Raudsepp; Soviet Estonia Prize 1972); The entire plan of the hotel is one of the most illustrious examples of the 1970s international style in Estonia. As a contemporary interior, you could sense the effects of Japanese traditional design of space in the direction of laconicism, which was expressed in particular in an empty hall that contained only some necessary furniture. A good example was Arne Jacobsen's Copenhagen Radisson SAS Hotel, which, unfortunately, did not get materialized with its designed ashtrays and tableware, but the interior architecture, however, was still created on an even level.

By taking in consideration the existing design of the "Estonia" theater, the reconstruction of the theatre (1975) has been solved.

As the last work, the interiors of Pirita's sailing center were completed (1980 with V. Asi, Leo Leesaar,  and Aulo Padar).

Published articles on space design (mainly in the almanac "Kunst ja Kodu")

We can not fail to mention the importance of nearly thirty years of collaboration with Vello Asi, during which several important objects were completed, and together for decades they educated young interior designers.

List of projects 
Hotel Park furniture and partial decor, Tartu, 1955

Furniture design for the serial production at the ‘Puit’ factory, 1956

House in Aegviidu (his own house), 1957–69

Architectural solution of the monument for the victims of fascism, Tartu, 1958 (completed in 1964, sculptor E. Rebane)

Furniture at the Furniture Exhibition of the Baltic Republics, 1959

Interior Design of the Tartu University School Club, Tartu, 1959

Interior Design and Furniture of the Tartu Department of the Soviet Estonian Art Foundation, 1959

Tartu State University Kääriku Sports Base Main Building and Dormitory Interior Design and Furniture, 1960

Kohtla-Järve Café Interior Design, 1962

Interior Design of the Club of Creative Alliances (Art Club or KUKU Club), 1963 (co-author A. Murdmaa)

Cafe International interior design and furniture, Moscow, 1963 (not completed)

Hotel International Design and Furniture, Moscow, 1963 (co-author A. Murdmaa) (not completed)

Cafe Pegasus Interior Design and Furniture, Tallinn, 1963 (co-authors L. Pärtelpoeg, A. Murdmaa)

Tallinn Hotel Interior Design and Furniture Sets, 1963 (co-author A. Murdmaa)

Restaurant Gloria Interior Design, Tallinn, 1963 (co-authors L. Pärtelpoeg and A. Murdmaa)

Interior Design and Auditorium Furniture of the new study building at TPI, Tallinn, 1964 (co-author L. Pärtelpoeg)

USSR Writers' Club, Moscow, 1964 (co-author A. Murdmaa)

Cafe Moscow, in Tallinn, 1965 (co-author H. Karro)

Furniture in the Hall of Pärnu Theater, 1965-67 (co-author V. Asi)

The interior design and furniture of Vanemuine Theater and Concert Hall, Tartu, 1965–67, 1970 (started with L. Pärtelpoja, co-author V. Asi)

Furniture for the Estonian SSR reception room of the Council of Ministers and partial décor, 1965

Interior Design and Furniture Sketch for the Office of the Ministry of Culture (Estonian SSR), 1966

Interior design and furniture sketches for the offices of the Ministry of Construction, 1966

Interior design of the offices of the Estonian SSR State Literature Committee, 1966

Interior design of the new building of the Estonian Academy of Arts, 1966-1967 (co-authors V. Asi, L. Pärtelpoeg)

Café Tuljak Interior Design and Furniture, Tallinn, 1966 (co-author V. Asi)

Design and furniture of the main building of the Kurtna Poultry Testing Station, 1967 (co-author V. Asi)

Cafe Tallinn, Tallinn, 1967-69 (co-author V. Asi)

Bar Karolina, Tallinn, 1968 (co-author V. Asi)

Hotel Viru Interiors, Tallinn, 1968-72 (co-authors V. Asi, Taevo Gans, Mait Summatavet and L.Raudsepp)

Interior Design of the Estonian Radio Administrative Building, Tallinn, 1970 (main author A.-H. Õun)

Interior design and furniture of the Republican Clinical Hospital Conference Hall, Tallinn, 1972

Theater Estonia, 1973 (co-author V. Asi)

Interior Design Project of the USSR Art Foundation's Export salon, 1975 (co-author V. Asi)

Interior Design of the Pirita Marine Center Yacht Club and Press Center, Tallinn, 1975-80 (co-authors V. Asi, L. Leesar, J. Lember and A. Padar)

Theater Vanemuine Small House Interior Design, Tartu, 1975

Interiors of the Presidium of the Hunting Society, Tallinn, 1981 (co-author V. Asi)

The study building of ERKI's room and furniture design department, Nooruse 11 (now known as Suur-Kloostri), Tallinn, 1983-84 (co-authors V. Asi and L.Leesaar)

Book Designs 
 A. Siig, Vaikuse tähtkuju, Eesti Raamat 1973
 A. Siig, Murdeajastu, Eesti Raamat 1976
 Cover designs of the almanac Kunst ja Kodu: 3/1960, 2/1963, 1/1966

Contests and national awards 
 1954 The II Prize of the Republican Furniture of the Standard Furniture
 1958 All-Union Furniture Competition II Prize
 1960 1st prize at the ETKVL Cafeteria and Restaurants furniture competition
 1967 Estonian SSR respected architect
 1967 Soviet Estonia Prize for the main building of the Kurtna Poultry Experimental Station (co-author V. Asi)
 1970 Medal for Excellent work
 1972 The Soviet Estonia Prize in the hotel Viru designers' team
 1980 Annual Prize at the Artists Union designers section for the Pirita Sailing Center

References 

1930 births
1986 deaths
Estonian designers
Interior designers
People from Tallinn
Estonian Academy of Arts alumni
Estonian expatriates in Finland
Burials at Metsakalmistu